Salma Djoubri (born 20 December 2002) is an inactive French tennis player. 

Djoubri has a career high WTA singles ranking of 412, achieved on 21 March 2022. She also has a career high WTA doubles ranking of 885, achieved on 18 March 2019. Djoubri has won three singles tournaments on the ITF circuit. 

Djoubri made her Grand Slam main-draw debut at the 2021 French Open doubles event, after she was awarded a wildcard partnering with Océane Dodin.

ITF Circuit finals

Singles: 3 (3 titles)

Doubles: 1 (runner–up)

References

External links
 
 

2002 births
Living people
French female tennis players
Sportspeople from Seine-Maritime